Ian Bowyer (born 6 June 1951) is an English former footballer who played mostly as a midfielder, best known for many honours in his career at Nottingham Forest. At Nottingham Forest he won the 1977–78 Football League and 1977–78 Football League Cup. The following season he won the 1979 European Cup Final and 1978–79 Football League Cup. He was part of Forest's successful retaining of the European Cup the season after. Other honours at Forest included the 1976–77 Anglo-Scottish Cup, 1976 promotion from the English second tier to the top flight, the 1978 FA Charity Shield and the 1979 UEFA Super Cup. At all clubs, in the league alone he played 599 first team games scoring 102 goals in a playing career spanning four decades.

He started his professional career at Manchester City winning Football League Cup and European Cup Winner's Cup Finals both in 1970. He then played two seasons at Orient before his lengthy career at Forest. His playing days at Forest were interrupted with a season at Sunderland. After Forest he went to Hereford United who he player managed winning the 1989-90 Welsh Cup. He has also been involved after playing at Plymouth Argyle, Rotherham United, Birmingham City, Nottingham Forest and Rushden and Diamonds.

Playing career

Manchester City
He started his career at Manchester City, debuting for the first team at Newcastle United on 16 November 1968. City won the 1969 FA Cup Final but Bowyer did not feature in the final.

The following season, as an 18-year-old, Bowyer made 33 full league appearances and one as substitute for City as they finished 11th in the First Division. He was also a regular in Manchester City's League Cup run and scored twice in their two-legged semi final against local rivals United. In March he came on as a substitute for Mike Summerbee in the 1970 Football League Cup Final beating West Bromwich Albion 2–1. Manchester City also won the Cup Winners Cup that season and Bowyer played his part in that European success too. City overcame Athletic Bilbao in the first round, 6–3 on aggregate with Bowyer playing in both and scoring in the second leg 3–0 home win. He also played in both second-round games against Belgian club Lierse S.K. but missed out on the next two rounds. He replaced Mike Doyle after 23 minutes in the 1970 European Cup Winners' Cup Final against Górnik Zabrze in Vienna. City won 2–1.

The following season he made 13 appearances for City, including six as substitute and one in the cup. His last game for the club was on 1 May 1971, against Tottenham Hotspur. In total he scored 13 goals in his 57 City first team appearances. After Peter Swales' takeover of the Manchester City and the exclusive appointment of Malcolm Allison, Bowyer was out of favor and was sold  to Orient under the management of George Petchey for £25,000.

Leyton Orient
Ian Bowyer, playing at no 11, was an ever present, and top scorer with 14 goals, for Orient in 1971–72. Bowyer scored a hat trick in his first game at Brisbane Road, a 4–1 win against Cardiff City. Orient beat Wrexham and Leicester City to reach the 5th Round. Bowyer scored in both those ties. Orient beat Chelsea 3–2 in the round of 16 to qualify for another all-London home tie against Arsenal in the quarter finals. The next season, as Orient struggled against relegation from the second division, Bowyer made 33 appearances and three as substitute.

Nottingham Forest
In 1973 Bowyer was signed by Allan Brown, then manager of Nottingham Forest for £25,000. Like Orient, Forest were also in the second tier of the Football League at the time. Bowyer made his debut at Blackpool on 20 October 1973, scoring in a 2–2 draw. Forest overcame Bristol Rovers 4–3 in one of the early Sunday matches in the FA Cup 3rd round setting up another home tie against his old club, Manchester City in the 4th round. Over 41,000 fans watched Forest eliminate first division City 4–1 with Bowyer scoring twice. The team overcame Portsmouth in the 5th Round before facing Newcastle United in the  quarter final at St James' Park. Bowyer was part of the team that appeared to be taking Forest through to the semi-finals, winning 3–1 against ten players, before Newcastle fans invaded the pitch and got the match suspended for eight minutes. When the game resumed, Newcastle stormed back to win 4–3, although the F.A. ordered that the match be replayed at Goodison Park, home of Everton. After a second replay, Newcastle prevailed. Brian Clough took over as manager in 1975, bringing in Peter Taylor as his assistant the year after. Bowyer and Forest were promoted back to the top tier at the end of the 1976–77 Football League, the first season Clough and Taylor were in joint charge at Forest.

In their first season back in the top flight Forest were Football League champions finishing seven points above Liverpool (at a time when two points were awarded for a win). Forest beat Liverpool in a replay in that season's 1978 Football League Cup Final.

Forest retained the League Cup the season after beating Southampton 3–2 with Bowyer an unused substitute in the final. They were drawn against Liverpool in the first round of the 1978–79 European Cup progressing 2–0 on aggregate. In the semi final Bowyer scored the decisive goal against FC Köln in the 1–0 win in Germany after a 3–3 draw in Nottingham. Bowyer played in the 1–0 1979 European Cup Final win against Malmo just as he did the following season against Hamburger SV.

Sunderland

He left Forest in January 1981 to join Sunderland, debuting for them on 28 January 1981 against Manchester United.

Return to Forest
The following year he re-joined Forest and went on to make another 200 league appearances for them, finishing with a total of 564 Forest senior games, scoring 96 goals.

Coaching and management

He joined Hereford United as a player-manager in July 1987, succeeding John Newman as manager three months later. He led Hereford to Welsh Cup glory in 1990 before leaving the club. He finished his playing career at Grantham Town.

In 1994, he became assistant manager to Peter Shilton at Plymouth Argyle, and he later moved to Rotherham United until September 1996. He later became a coach at Birmingham City.

He returned to Forest as coach in 2002, and stayed for three years. In 2006, he was appointed assistant manager to Paul Hart at Rushden & Diamonds, and he later scouted for Portsmouth.

Managerial statistics

All competitive league games (league and domestic cup) and international matches (including friendlies) are included.

Honours
Manchester City
 FA Cup: 1968–69
 League Cup: 1969–70
 UEFA Cup Winners' Cup: 1969–70

Nottingham Forest
 Football League First Division: 1977–78
 League Cup: 1977–78, 1978–79
 FA Charity Shield: 1978
 Anglo-Scottish Cup: 1976–77
 Football League Second Division: promoted 1976–77
 European Cup: 1978–79, 1979–80
 UEFA Super Cup: 1979

References

Playfair football annuals

External links
 Stats at football-heroes
 Profile on the Official Grantham Town website

Living people
1951 births
People from Ellesmere Port
English footballers
Footballers from Cheshire
Association football midfielders
English Football League players
Manchester City F.C. players
Leyton Orient F.C. players
Nottingham Forest F.C. players
Sunderland A.F.C. players
Hereford United F.C. players
Grantham Town F.C. players
English football managers
Hereford United F.C. managers
Portsmouth F.C. non-playing staff
UEFA Champions League winning players
Outfield association footballers who played in goal